Anuar Abu Bakar (28 April 1971 – 6 May 2019) was a Malaysian footballer who was the head coach for UiTM FC (U-21). Anuar used to be an assistant coach at PKNS FC.

Death
He died on 6 May 2019, aged 48, from liver cancer.

References

1971 births
2019 deaths
Association football forwards
Association football midfielders
Deaths from cancer in Malaysia
Deaths from liver cancer
Kelantan FA players
Malaysian footballers
Malaysia Super League players
Penang F.C. players
People from Johor
People from Muar